The 2011 Aragon motorcycle Grand Prix was the fourteenth round of the 2011 Grand Prix motorcycle racing season. It took place on the weekend of 16–18 September 2011 at the Motorland Aragón circuit.

MotoGP classification

Moto2 classification

125cc classification

Notes

Championship standings after the race (MotoGP)
Below are the standings for the top five riders and constructors after round fourteen has concluded.

Riders' Championship standings

Constructors' Championship standings

 Note: Only the top five positions are included for both sets of standings.

References

Aragon motorcycle Grand Prix
Aragon
Aragon
Aragon motorcycle Grand Prix